Cymindis aradensis is a species of ground beetle in the subfamily Harpalinae. It was described by Kirschenhofer in 1984.

References

aradensis
Beetles described in 1984